A licence to use or LTU is a licence to use an intellectual property such as a patent or trademark.  This is distinct from other types of licence such as a licence to manufacture or copy the invention or design.  It is the sort of licence commonly issued for the use of computer software.

References

Intellectual property law